IV is a compilation album by the Stranglers, released on 24 September 1980 on I.R.S. Records and only available in the US and Canada.

The Stranglers previous album, The Raven, had not been released in the US. IV contained, on side one, a selection of tracks from The Raven. Side two contained the following tracks, which were previously unreleased on any Stranglers album: "5 Minutes" and "Rok It to the Moon" (1978 UK single), "Vietnamerica" (which was later released as the B-side to the 1981 "Let Me Introduce You to the Family" UK single), "G.m.B.H" (an extended version of the 1980 UK single "Bear Cage", which was unavailable elsewhere) and "Who Wants the World?" (1980 UK single). The previously unreleased "Vietnamerica" was written and recorded during sessions for The Raven.

The original release also came with a free single containing "Choosey Susie" (from the 1977 UK single free with the Rattus Norvegicus album), "Straighten Out" (b-side to the 1977 UK Single "Something Better Change") plus "Ode to Joy / Do The European" (a live Jean-Jacques Burnel solo track, unavailable elsewhere until the 1992 CD release of his first solo album Euroman Cometh), and "White Room", a Cream cover from the Nosferatu album by Hugh Cornwell and Robert Williams.

Track listing

Note
The extended version of "G.m.B.H" is not the full six-and-a-half-minute version of the track as it is faded out earlier, lasting just under four minutes. 

Free single

Personnel 
Credits adapted from the album liner notes.

The Stranglers
 Hugh Cornwell – guitar, vocals
 Jean-Jacques Burnel – bass, vocals
 Dave Greenfield – keyboards
 Jet Black – Drums

Technical
The Stranglers – production (1-5, 8-10)
Alan Winstanley – production (1-5), engineering (1-7)
Martin Rushent – production (6, 7)
Steve Churchyard – production (9), engineering (1-5, 8, 9)
Gary Edwards – engineering (10)
Laurence Diana – engineering (10)
John Pasche – art direction 
Shoot That Tiger! – design  
Phil Jude – cover photography

References

External links

Albums produced by Alan Winstanley
Albums produced by Martin Rushent
1980 compilation albums
The Stranglers compilation albums
I.R.S. Records compilation albums